2012 State Basketball League season may refer to:

2012 MSBL season, Men's SBL season
2012 WSBL season, Women's SBL season